Nigorella aethiopica is a jumping spider species in the genus Nigorella that lives in Ethiopia. It was first described in 2008.

References

Endemic fauna of Ethiopia
Salticidae
Fauna of Ethiopia
Spiders of Africa
Spiders described in 2008
Taxa named by Wanda Wesołowska